Outlander is a series of historical fantasy novels by American author Diana Gabaldon. Gabaldon began the first volume of the series, Outlander, in the late 1980s, and it was published in 1991. She has published nine out of a planned ten volumes. The ninth novel in the series, Go Tell the Bees That I Am Gone, was released on November 23, 2021.

The Outlander series focuses on 20th-century British nurse Claire Randall, who time travels to 18th-century Scotland and finds adventure and romance with the dashing Highland warrior Jamie Fraser. The books have sold over 50 million copies worldwide as of 2021.

Among the many derived works are two short stories, three novellas, a novel series featuring recurring secondary character Lord John Grey, a graphic novel, a musical, and a television series.

Publishing history

Outlander novel series

Novels
 Outlander (1991) (published in the UK, New Zealand and Australia as Cross Stitch)
 Dragonfly in Amber (1992)
 Voyager (1993)
 Drums of Autumn (1996)
 The Fiery Cross (2001)
 A Breath of Snow and Ashes (2005)
 An Echo in the Bone (2009)
 Written in My Own Heart's Blood (2014)
 Go Tell the Bees That I Am Gone (2021)

Audiobooks
The Outlander series has been released in unabridged (read by Davina Porter), and abridged audiobooks (read by Geraldine James). Several of the Lord John books have been released in audiobook form, read by Jeff Woodman.

Novellas and short stories
 "A Leaf on the Wind of All Hallows" (2010), a short story in the anthology Songs of Love and Death, later collected in A Trail of Fire (2012), and Seven Stones to Stand or Fall (2017). It tells the WWII story of Roger MacKenzie Wakefield's parents Jerry and Dolly, as Jerry discovers for himself the mystery of the standing stones.
 "The Space Between" (2013), a novella in the anthology The Mad Scientist's Guide to World Domination, later collected in A Trail of Fire (2012), and Seven Stones to Stand or Fall (2017). It chronicles a journey undertaken by Joan MacKimmie (Jamie Fraser's step-daughter) and Michael Murray (Jenny Fraser Murray's son).
 "Virgins" (2013), a novella in the anthology Dangerous Women, later available as a standalone e-book, and collected in Seven Stones to Stand or Fall (2017). Set in 1740 France, it introduces 19-year-old Jamie Fraser as he and his 20-year-old friend Ian Murray become young mercenaries.
"Past Prologue" (2017), a short story published in the anthology MatchUp. It is written as a collaboration by Steve Berry and Diana Gabaldon, in a story that crosses over their two fictional universes, with Cotton Malone from Berry's novels meeting Jamie Fraser. 
 "A Fugitive Green" (2017), a novella published in the Gabaldon collection Seven Stones to Stand or Fall. It features Hal Grey, brother of Lord John Grey, and his future wife Minerva.

Graphic novel

In 2010, Gabaldon adapted the first third of Outlander into a graphic novel, illustrated by Hoang Nguyen.

Lord John series

The Lord John series is a sequence of novels and shorter works that center on Lord John Grey, a recurring secondary character from the Outlander novels. The spin-off series consists of five novellas and three novels, which all take place between 1756 and 1761, during the events of Gabaldon's Voyager. They can be generally categorized as historical mysteries, and the three novels are shorter and focus on fewer plot threads than the main Outlander books. Several of the Lord John books have been released in audiobook form, read by Jeff Woodman.

Other
 The Outlandish Companion (1999), a guide to the Outlander series containing synopses, a character guide, and other notes and information; revised and updated as The Outlandish Companion (Volume One) (2015)
 The Outlandish Companion (Volume Two) (2015)

Inspiration

Gabaldon was inspired by the Doctor Who character Jamie McCrimmon to set her series in Jacobite Scotland, and to name its protagonist Jamie.

Frazer Hines, who played McCrimmon, appears in an episode of the first season of the television series Outlander.

Characters

Core characters include:
 Claire Beauchamp Randall Fraser, the titular Outlander, a 20th-century nurse (and later doctor) who travels through time to the 18th century
 Jamie Fraser, Claire's 18th-century husband
 Frank Randall, Claire's 20th-century husband
 Brianna Randall, Claire and Jamie's daughter
 Roger Wakefield, a 20th-century historian
 Jonathan "Black Jack" Randall, Frank's sadistic 18th-century ancestor
 Lord John Grey, a secondary character in the main series and the focus of the spin-off Lord John series

Musical 
In 2010, a 14-song cycle based on Outlander was released under the title Outlander: The Musical. With music by Kevin Walsh and lyrics by Mike Gibb, the project was approved by Gabaldon after Gibb had approached the author in Scotland with the idea to adapt her novel into a stage production. As Gabaldon recalled, "I laughed and said, 'That’s the screwiest idea I’ve heard yet – go ahead.' So they did, and the results were stunning." Though the stage production remains in development, the 14-song cycle is available on CD from Amazon.com and for download on iTunes.

In 2012, Broadway composer Jill Santoriello began collaborating with Gibb and Walsh on the project, writing the music and cowriting the lyrics with Gibb for a new song called "One More Time." The song was recorded with vocals by Rebecca Robbins.

Television series

In June 2013, Starz ordered 16 episodes of a television adaptation, and production began in October 2013 in Scotland. The series premiered in the US on August 9, 2014 with Caitríona Balfe and Sam Heughan starring as Claire and Jamie. It was picked up for a second season on August 15, 2014, and for a third and fourth season on June 1, 2016. On May 9, 2018, Starz renewed the series for a fifth and sixth season. Further renewals for seventh and eighth seasons were announced in early 2021 and late 2022 respectively.

In January 2023, Starz greenlighted a 10-episode prequel series, Blood of My Blood, based on Jamie's parents. Gabaldon will be an executive producer.

References

External links 
 
 
 

American historical novels
American romance novels
Book series introduced in 1991
Hispanic and Latino American novels
Historical novels by series
 
Science fiction book series
Romance novel series
Novels set in Scotland
Novels set in England
Novels set in the 18th century
Time-travel romance novels